Eoleptestheria ticinensis is a species of clam shrimp in the family Leptestheriidae. Although up to eight species have formerly been recognised in the genus Eoleptestheria, they are more usually all considered part of one species with a cosmopolitan distribution.

References

Branchiopoda genera
Monotypic arthropod genera
Spinicaudata
Taxonomy articles created by Polbot
Taxobox binomials not recognized by IUCN